Pyralosis terminalis is a species of snout moth in the genus Pyralosis. It was described by Walter Rothschild in 1915. It is found in Algeria.

References

Moths described in 1915
Pyralinae
Endemic fauna of Algeria
Moths of Africa